Samuel L. Bartlett was an American architect who worked in Saint Paul, Minnesota, in the early 1900s. He was appointed to the position of architect with the Great Northern Railway in 1905. Bartlett was tasked to bring to reality the vision of Great Northern President Louis W. Hill for great destination hotels in the newly created Glacier National Park (U.S.). Several of the lodges and stations Bartlett designed for the Great Northern are listed in the National Register of Historic Places.
 Great Northern Depot, Minot, North Dakota, 1905
 Great Northern Passenger and Freight Depot, 1 Court Street, Aberdeen, North Dakota, 1906, listed on the NRHP in Brown County, South Dakota
 Great Northern Depot, 536 5th Avenue North, Fargo, North Dakota, 1906, Richardsonian Romanesque style
 Great Northern Depot, 402 East Lake Street, Wayzata, Minnesota, 1906, Tudor Revival style, NRHP-listed
 Great Northern Depot, 201 West Dewey Street, Rugby, North Dakota, 1907, NRHP-listed
 Great Northern Jackson Street Engine House, Jackson Street and Pennsylvania Avenue, Saint Paul, Minnesota, 1907, now part of the Minnesota Transportation Museum
 Great Northern Depot, Williston, North Dakota, 1910
 Great Northern Depot, R Avenue and 7th Street, Anacortes, Washington, 1911, listed on the NRHP in Skagit County, Washington 
 Great Northern Passenger and Freight Depot, Fairview, Montana, 1913
 Great Northern Depot, 100-110 Neill Avenue, Helena, Montana, 1913 (demolished)
 Glacier Park Lodge, Glacier Park, Montana, 1913, National Park Service rustic style, NRHP-listed
 Granite Park Chalet, Glacier Park, Montana, 1914, NRHP-listed
 Two Medicine Store, Glacier Park, Montana, 1914, NRHP-listed
 Hope Glen Farm, Cottage Grove, Minnesota

Gallery

References

Architects from Saint Paul, Minnesota
American railway architects
Great Northern Railway (U.S.)
Year of birth missing
Year of death missing
20th-century American architects